Gbako is a Local Government Area in Niger State, Nigeria. Its headquarters are in the town of Lemu in the north of the area at. The Kaduna River forms its western boundary.

It has an area of 1,753 km and a population of 127,466 at the 2006 census.

The postal code of the area is 912.

References

Local Government Areas in Niger State